The Battle of Itea or Battle of Agali (Ναυμαχία της Αγκάλης) was a naval battle fought on 30 September 1827, in the Gulf of Corinth, during the Greek War of Independence. Under the command of British Philhellene, Frank Abney Hastings, a small Greek squadron launched a raid on an Ottoman fleet anchored near Itea.

Opposing forces 
The Greek squadron consisted of a brig and two small gunboats led by the flagship Karteria, a steam-powered warship. Opposing the Greeks was the Ottoman fleet, consisting of three schooners, three brigs, three transports and a gunboat, protected by shore batteries

The battle 
As Hastings with the Karteria approached, the Ottoman fleet confident of the superiority of their firepower, would initially hold their fire. As Hastings approached within 500 yards of the Ottoman ships he ordered his fleet to drop anchor. After an initial ranging shot by the Karteria, the Ottoman ships would open fire focusing their shots on the steamship. In reply to this, the Karteria would begin firing grapeshot with the intention of disabling the Ottoman crews and to destroy their ships' rigging, while the Greek ship's guns would open fire with explosive rounds destroying three Ottoman vessels. The Ottoman shore batteries would also come under fire by grape, dispersing their men. Hastings would attempt to capture the remaining Ottoman vessels while coming under musket fire from Ottoman troops who had returned to their posts. Hastings would succeed in capturing two ships, and set fire to the remaining four.

Aftermath 
News of the Greek victory would quickly spread contributing to fresh recruits joining the revolutionary forces, while after learning of Hastings victory Ibrahim Pasha vowed to take revenge by destroying the Karteria, a promise which would remain unrealized. The battle also served as a catalyst to the Battle of Navarino, by provoking aggressive actions by Ibrahim Pasha.

References 

1827 in Greece
Conflicts in 1827
Itea
Itea
September 1827 events
Gulf of Corinth